Esioff-Léon Patenaude, often called E.L. Patenaude (February 12, 1875 – February 7, 1963) was a Canadian statesman who served as the 17th Lieutenant Governor of Quebec. Born in Saint-Isidore, Quebec, in 1875, he studied law at the University of Montreal and was called to the Quebec Bar in 1899. He established a successful law practice, was soon drawn to politics, and served as a chief organizer for the Conservative Party of Canada in Montreal.

He was first elected to the Quebec National Assembly as a Conservative in La Prairie in the 1908 provincial election and was re-elected in the 1912 election. In 1915, he was elected to the House of Commons of Canada in a by-election and joined the government of Prime Minister Sir Robert Borden as Minister of Inland Revenue. He served in that position until early 1917, when he was appointed as Secretary of State and Minister of Mines. In July, however, Patenaude resigned from the Canadian Cabinet in protest of the government's decision to implement conscription. He chose not to seek re-election in the 1917 federal election. When Arthur Meighen became Prime Minister in 1920, he offered Patenaude a seat in cabinet, who declined.

Returning to provincial politics, Patenaude was re-elected to the Quebec National Assembly in Jacques-Cartier in 1923. In 1925, however, Meighen persuaded Patenaude to return to federal politics as his Quebec lieutenant. He was given almost exclusive authority over the Conservative Party's campaign in Quebec during the 1925 federal election as Meighen's Quebec lieutenant. Patenaude proved, however, to be little match for Ernest Lapointe and the Liberal Party of Canada, and secured only 4 seats in the province. Patenaude, who had resigned his seat in the Quebec National Assembly to contest the election, was himself defeated.

Despite the setback, Patenaude continued to enjoy the favour of Meighen. When Meighen formed a second government in 1926, he appointed Patenaude as Minister of Justice and Attorney General of Canada. Patenaude led the Conservative Party in Quebec for a second time during the 1926 federal election but again fared poorly and was himself defeated.

In 1934, the Governor General of Canada, on the advice of Canadian Prime Minister Richard Bedford Bennett, appointed Patenaude as Lieutenant Governor of Quebec, a position in which he served until his retirement from public life in 1939. In his later years, he experienced a successful career as a banker (became President of the Provincial Bank of Canada in 1946) and businessman (as director of McColl Frontenac, Crown Life Insurance and board of Texaco Canada).

Electoral record

External links
 
 

|-

1875 births
1963 deaths
Canadian King's Counsel
Conservative Party of Canada (1867–1942) MPs
Lieutenant Governors of Quebec
Members of the House of Commons of Canada from Quebec
Members of the King's Privy Council for Canada
Conservative Party of Quebec MNAs
Université Laval alumni
Quebec lieutenants
People from Montérégie
Burials at Notre Dame des Neiges Cemetery